Leonard Birks (6 October 1896 – 22 March 1975) was an English footballer who played as a defender. Born in Fenton, Staffordshire he started his career with Port Vale before spending seven years at Sheffield United. After leaving Bramall Lane he played for Plymouth Argyle, Bristol City and Yeovil & Petters United, as well as having a spell as first team coach at Bristol City.

Career
Birks joined Port Vale from Butt Lane Star in May 1920. He made his Second Division debut in 1920–21, but remained a fringe player in 1921–22, despite lifting the North Staffordshire Infirmary Cup in 1922. However, he missed just one game of the 1922–23 campaign, and was an ever-present in 1923–24. He retained his first team place in the highly successful 1924–25 season, but with dependable young left-back Jimmy Oakes waiting in the reserves to take his place, manager Joe Schofield decided to cash in on Birks.

He was sold to Sheffield United for 'a substantial sum' in October 1924 as the Blades sought a replacement for regular left back Ernest Milton. Birks initially failed to settle at Bramall Lane however and missed out on a place in the 1925 FA Cup Final with the ageing Milton being preferred. Never a fully established first team player, Birks did give good service to the Blades during his time playing over 200 games in all competitions.

After leaving United in February 1931, Birks joined up with Plymouth Argyle. Competing with former England international Fred Titmuss for the left-back position, he made 49 league and cup appearances, before departing Home Park for Bristol City in April 1933. He later played non-league football for Yeovil & Petters United, before returning to Bristol to work as first team coach.

Career statistics
Source:

References

1896 births
1975 deaths
People from Fenton, Staffordshire
People from Shirehampton
Footballers from Stoke-on-Trent
English footballers
Association football defenders
Port Vale F.C. players
Sheffield United F.C. players
Plymouth Argyle F.C. players
Bristol City F.C. players
Yeovil Town F.C. players
English Football League players
Southern Football League players
Association football coaches